The Alexander Nevsky Cathedral is a Russian Orthodox church in Izhevsk, Udmurtia dedicated to St. Alexander Nevsky. The Neoclassical building has a round golden cupola, an Ionic portico and a steepled bell tower rising above it.

Like the Dnipropetrovsk Cathedral in Ukraine, the building was modeled on St. Andrew's Cathedral in Kronstadt (whose architect was Andreyan Zakharov). It was erected between 1818 and 1823 and was visited by Alexander I of Russia within several months after its completion. (Alexander Nevsky was the emperor's patron saint). In the Soviet years the building stood domeless and was used as a cinema.

See also 
 St. Michael's Cathedral (Izhevsk)

References 

Izhevsk
Russian Orthodox cathedrals in Russia
Churches completed in 1823
19th-century Russian Orthodox church buildings
Buildings and structures in Udmurtia
Tourist attractions in Udmurtia
Izhevsk
Neoclassical church buildings in Russia
Cultural heritage monuments in Udmurtia
Objects of cultural heritage of Russia of federal significance